Chung Hwan Kwak, (born January 22, 1936) is a South Korean religious leader.  He was a prominent leader of the international Unification Church (UC), having been appointed to many leadership positions in Unification Church related organizations by its founder Sun Myung Moon. Since 2002 he had been the Chairman and President of News World Communications, which owns United Press International,  and numerous other publications, including the Middle East Times, and Tiempos del Mundo, a Spanish-language newspaper published in 16 countries throughout the Americas. He was also the president of the Family Party for the Universal Peace and Unity, a South Korean political party founded by UC members, one of whose main goals is the reunification of Korea. He was formerly the President of  the Family Federation for World Peace and Unification and has been described as Sun Myung Moon's assistant and advisor. He was also the chairman of the ″Social Responsibility Committee″ for the Asian Football Confederation.

In 2004, Washington Post columnist David Ignatius reported that Kwak wanted The Washington Times to "support international organizations such as the United Nations and to campaign for world peace and interfaith understanding." This, Ignatius wrote, created difficulties for editor Wesley Pruden and some of the Times columnists. Ignatius also mentioned the Unification movement's reconciliatory attitude towards North Korea, which at the time included joint business ventures, and Kwak's advocacy for greater understanding between the U.S. and the Islamic world as issues of contention. Ignatius predicted that conservatives in Congress and the George W. Bush administration would support Pruden's position over Kwak's.

Kwak's daughter, Jun Sook Kwak, is married to Moon's son, Hyun Jin Preston Moon, the leader of the Global Peace Foundation.  Kwak left the UC in 2009 after internal strife and is now the Honorary President of the Global Peace Foundation.

After the assassination of former Japanese Prime Minister Shinzo Abe, Kwak held a press conference in which he apologized, saying that the UC was responsible for the assassination. According to Kwak, a wave of bankruptcies, divorces and suicides among Japanese UC members had prompted him to attempt to normalize Japan's status as an "economic force" in 2001, but his attempt was thwarted by strong opposition from other UC leaders.

Speeches and writings
 collected speeches and writings

References

Living people
1936 births
South Korean Unificationists